The World Para Ice Hockey Championships, known before 30 November 2016 as the IPC Ice Sledge Hockey World Championships, are the world championships for sledge hockey. They are organised by the International Paralympic Committee through its World Para Ice Hockey subcommittee.

The first sanctioned World Para Ice Hockey Championships were held in Nynäshamn, Sweden in 1996.

On 30 November 2016, the IPC, which serves as the international governing body for 10 disability sports, adopted the "World Para" branding across all of those sports. At the same time, it changed the official name of the sport from "sledge hockey" to "Para Ice hockey". The name of the world championships was immediately changed to "World Para Ice Hockey Championships" (WPIHC).

Pool A

Results

Medal table

Participating nations

Pool B

Participating nations

Pool C

See also
Para ice hockey at the Winter Paralympics
IPC Ice Sledge Hockey European Championships
Ice Hockey World Championships

References

External links
World Para Ice Hockey

 
World
Sledge hockey
Recurring sporting events established in 1996
Sledge